Alexander Wiseman was a 13th-14th century Scottish nobleman and the Sheriff of Forres and Nairn.

Life
Alexander was the brother of William Wiseman and was appointed in 1305, as the Sheriff of Forres and Nairn.

Notes

References
 Robertson, A.B. (1934); Annals of the royal burgh of Forres

Medieval Gaels from Scotland
13th-century Scottish judges
14th-century Scottish judges
Year of birth unknown
Year of death unknown
Scottish people of the Wars of Scottish Independence
People from Moray